In contemporary astronomy, 88 constellations are recognized by the International Astronomical Union (IAU). Each constellation is a region of the sky, bordered by arcs of right ascension and declination. Together they cover the  celestial sphere, with their boundaries adopted officially by the International Astronomical Union in 1928 and published in 1930.

The ancient Mesopotamians and later the Greeks established most of the northern constellations in international use today, listed by the Roman-Egyptian astronomer Ptolemy. The constellations along the ecliptic are called the zodiac. When explorers mapped the stars of the southern skies, European astronomers proposed new constellations for that region, as well as ones to fill gaps between the traditional constellations. Due to Roman and European transmission each constellation has a Latin name. In 1922, the International Astronomical Union adopted three-letter abbreviations for 89 constellations, the modern list of 88 plus Argo.  After this, Eugène Joseph Delporte drew up boundaries for each of the 88 constellations so that every point in the sky belonged to one constellation.

History

Some constellations are no longer recognized by the IAU, but may appear in older star charts and other references.  Most notable is Argo Navis, which was one of Ptolemy's original 48 constellations. In the 1750s the French astronomer Nicolas Louis de Lacaille divided this into three separate constellations: Carina, Puppis, and Vela.

Modern constellations
The 88 constellations depict 42 animals, 29 inanimate objects and 17 humans or mythological characters.

Abbreviations
Each IAU constellation has an official 3-letter abbreviation based on the genitive form of the constellation name. As the genitive is similar to the base name, the majority of the abbreviations are just the first three letters of the constellation name:  Ori for Orion/Orionis, Ara for Ara/Arae, Com for Coma Berenices/Comae Berenices. In some cases, the abbreviation contains letters from the genitive not appearing in the base name (as in Hyi for Hydrus/Hydri, to avoid confusion with Hydra, abbreviated Hya; and Sge for Sagitta/Sagittae, to avoid confusion with Sagittarius, abbreviated Sgr). Some abbreviations use letters beyond the initial three to unambiguously identify the constellation (for example when the name and its genitive differ in the first three letters): Aps for Apus/Apodis, CrA for Corona Australis, CrB for Corona Borealis, Crv for Corvus.  (Crater is abbreviated Crt to prevent confusion with CrA.) When letters are taken from the second word of a two-word name, the first letter from the second word is capitalised:  CMa for Canis Major, CMi for Canis Minor. Two cases are ambiguous: Leo for the constellation Leo could be mistaken for Leo Minor (abbreviated LMi), and Tri for Triangulum could be mistaken for Triangulum Australe (abbreviated TrA). 

In addition to the three-letter abbreviations used today, the IAU also introduced four-letter abbreviations in 1932. The four-letter abbreviations were repealed in 1955 and are now obsolete, but were included in the NASA Dictionary of Technical Terms for Aerospace Use (NASA SP-7) published in 1965. These are labeled "NASA" in the table below and are included here for reference only.

List 
For help with the literary English pronunciations, see the pronunciation key. There is considerable diversity in how Latinate names are pronounced in English. For traditions closer to the original, see Latin spelling and pronunciation.

Asterisms

Various other unofficial patterns exist alongside the constellations.  These are known as "asterisms". Examples include the Big Dipper/Plough and the Northern Cross.
Some ancient asterisms, for example Coma Berenices, Serpens, and portions of Argo Navis, are now officially constellations.

See also
 Lists of astronomical objects
 List of constellations by area
 Biblical names of stars
 Lists of stars by constellation
 Constellation family
 Galactic quadrant

Notes

References

External links
 http://www.ianridpath.com/constellations1.html – Ian Ridpath's list of constellations.
 http://www.ianridpath.com/startales/contents.html – Ian Ridpath's Star Tales.
 http://cdsarc.u-strasbg.fr/viz-bin/Cat?cat=VI/49 – CDS's archive of constellation boundaries.  The text file constbnd.dat gives the 1875.0 coordinates of the vertices of the constellation regions, together with the constellations adjacent to each boundary segment.

IAU constellations